The  of the Japan Academy Film Prize is one of the annual Awards given by the Japan Academy Film Prize Association.

List of winners

External links
Japan Academy Film Prize official website - 

Screenplay of the Year